Original Soundtracks 1 is a studio album recorded by rock band U2 and Brian Eno under the pseudonym Passengers as a side project. Released on 6 November 1995, the album is a collection of songs written for mostly imaginary films (the exceptions being songs for Ghost in the Shell, Miss Sarajevo, and Beyond the Clouds). Owing to Eno's involvement as a full songwriting partner and the album's experimental nature, the moniker "Passengers" was chosen to distinguish it from U2's conventional albums. It was commercially unnoticed by the band's standards and received generally mixed reviews. Guest musicians on the record included Italian opera singer Luciano Pavarotti (on "Miss Sarajevo") and producer Howie B, who would co-produce U2's following album, Pop (1997).

Background
According to Eno, near the end of the recording sessions for U2's 1993 album Zooropa, the band hit "a stone wall" and were getting obsessive about small details. At that point, Eno suggested the group do some improvisation, "just turn the tape on and play, so we were working with a broad brush rather than the one-hair brushes we'd been using. It was designed to open us up a little". The resulting recording sessions were productive enough that Eno advocated the band undertake more. After they completed their Zoo TV Tour in December 1993, the band returned to the studio with no particular agenda or project on which to work. Their original intention was to record a soundtrack for Peter Greenaway's 1996 film The Pillow Book. Though the plan did not come to fruition, Eno suggested they continue recording for imaginary films. The result was about 25 hours of recorded experimentation that produced Original Soundtracks 1.

At this time, the US charts were dominated by movie soundtrack albums and singles. Once Eno pointed out that it would not be a real ploy for radio airplay, but a spoof of one, U2 agreed to the concept.

U2 had frequently improvised in the past, and in the Original Soundtracks 1 sessions they engaged in free-form jamming to video clips from various films. Eno stated, "Listening to the original improvisations as they came off the floor, you feel the excitement of the process ... You have to be careful not to disturb the organic flow of the thing." The group brought in producer Howie B to cut down and mix some of the tracks after several hours of jam sessions had been recorded.

Part of the group's intent in creating Original Soundtracks 1 had been to make a "night-time" record. Lead vocalist Bono said, "It feels like it's been set on the bullet train in Tokyo. Every record has a location, a place where you enjoy listening to it, whether that be a bedroom or a club, well this record location is a fast train. It's slo-mo music though. But it has an odd sense of speed in the background." He also noted that when creating works for soundtracks the visual suggestion from the music is more important than the story told by the lyrics. With this in mind the band had tried to create "visual music" when recording, continuing a trend that began with their 1993 song "Zooropa".

Writing, recording, and composition
The genesis, recording and subsequent release of the album is detailed in Eno's diaries A Year with Swollen Appendices.

About half of the album is instrumental, and the vocal tracks generally stray from the clear hooks and melodies that usually define U2's work. Of these, the delicate "Miss Sarajevo", featuring Italian tenor Luciano Pavarotti on vocals, is considered the most memorable.

One of the tracks, "Your Blue Room", features Adam Clayton reciting the final verse. This marks only his second recorded vocal on a U2 project, the first being on "Endless Deep", the B-side to 1983's "Two Hearts Beat as One".

Brian Eno alluded to some extra tracks that were recorded with the Japanese singer Holi at the time and that they may be released at some point in the future: "...in fact we did several things together in four hours.  Some of the other pieces are really lovely too, and I'm sure will see the light of day. But she was absolutely fantastic."

Music for films
The album alleges to be a collection of songs written for movies, hence the title Original Soundtracks. The album's booklet contains detailed descriptions of the film for which each song was written. Most of the films are non-existent; however, three of the 13 films listed on the album are real: Beyond the Clouds, Miss Sarajevo, and Ghost in the Shell (One Minute Warning played during the closing credits).

This concept can be seen as something of a successor to Eno's Music for Films album and is also the base of the Dutch electronic duo Arling & Cameron's album Music for Imaginary Films.

"Miss Sarajevo" was released as a successful single, competing (in the UK) for the 1995 Christmas number 1 spot ultimately losing to Michael Jackson's "Earth Song", however; it also later appeared on U2's The Best of 1990–2000 compilation in 2002. "Your Blue Room" was intended for the second single following "Miss Sarajevo," but was cancelled after poor album sales. The song was later released as a B-side on the "Staring at the Sun" single in 1997, and on the B-sides disc of The Best of 1990–2000.

The Japanese edition release include "Bottoms (Watashitachi No Ookina Yume) (Zoo Station Remix)" as a bonus track, which is also featured as B-side to the "Miss Sarajevo" single. The track is an instrumental version of the U2 song "Zoo Station", which appears on 1991's Achtung Baby. The Japanese subtitle "Watashitachi No Ookina Yume" translates to English as "our big dream." Some UK promo copies of the album list "Bottoms" as well but the track is not actually present on the compact disc.

The track "Always Forever Now" appeared only briefly in the film Heat, but was included in the soundtrack, which also includes other tracks by Brian Eno. The track "Plot 180" was also used in the film Heat but only in a deleted scene.

The film descriptions contain many hidden references and in-jokes, beginning with the descriptions' supposed authors, "Ben O'Rian and C. S. J. Bofop", both references to Brian Eno. The first is a simple anagram of the name, while the second replaces each letter with the alphabetically following letter.

Reception

Because of the nature of the music and the decision to release it under another name, the album is easily the least-known and poorest-selling in the U2 catalogue. Further, critical reaction from the fans and even the band members has been mixed. Drummer Larry Mullen Jr. has stated his dislike of the album: "There's a thin line between interesting music and self-indulgence. We crossed it on the Passengers record." Later reflecting on the album in 2002, Mullen stated, "It hasn't grown on me. However, 'Miss Sarajevo' is a classic." Bono objected to Mullen's statement in the same documentary, claiming that "Larry just didn't like [Passengers] because we didn't let him play the drums."

Track listing

Personnel
Passengers
Bono – vocals, additional guitar, piano on "Beach Sequence"
Adam Clayton – bass guitar, additional guitar on "Your Blue Room", percussion, narration on "Your Blue Room"
The Edge – guitar, keyboards, backing vocals, lead vocals on "Corpse," church organ on "Your Blue Room"
Brian Eno – strategies, sequencers, keyboards, backing vocals, guitar, treatments, mixing, chorus voices, vocals on "A Different Kind of Blue", production
Larry Mullen Jr. – drums, percussion, rhythm sequence on "One Minute Warning," rhythm synthesizer on "United Colours"

Additional personnel
Luciano Pavarotti – tenor voice on "Miss Sarajevo"
Holi – vocals on "Ito Okashi," voices on "One Minute Warning"
Howie B – mixing, treatments, scratching, and rhythm track on "Elvis Ate America"
Craig Armstrong – string arrangement on "Miss Sarajevo"
Paul Barrett – string arrangement on "Always Forever Now"
Des Broadbery – sequencer on "Always Forever Now"
David Herbert – saxophone on "United Colours" and "Corpse"
Holger Zschenderlein – additional synthesizer on "One Minute Warning"

Charts

See also
Music for Films – a similar concept album series by Eno solo
Heat (soundtrack)

References

External links
Original Soundtracks 1 on U2.com

1995 albums
Albums produced by Brian Eno
Brian Eno albums
Collaborative albums
Concept albums
Island Records albums
U2 albums
Works published under a pseudonym